The Pitchfork Music Festival 2008 was held on July 18 to 20, 2008 at the Union Park, Chicago, United States.

In that year, Pitchfork partnered up with promotion companies All Tomorrow's Parties to present a Don't Look Back stage, on which all of the bands performed one of their classic albums in its entirety on Friday.

Lineup
Artists listed from latest to earliest set times.

Notes

References

External links

Pitchfork Music Festival
2008 music festivals